Lee Dong-phil is a South Korean politician who, as of April 2014, serves as Minister of Agriculture, Food and Rural Affairs.

Education 
March 1971 – February 1974: Graduated from Daegeon High School
March 1974 – February 1978: Bachelor's Degree in Livestock Management, Yeungnam University
March 1979 – August 1981: Master's Degree in Economics, Seoul National University
January 1988 – December 1991: Doctoral Degree in Agricultural Economics, University of Missouri, United States

Major career 
March 2013 – September 2016: Minister of Agriculture, Food and Rural Affairs
October 2011 – March 2013: President of the Korea Rural Economic Institute
June 1980 – March 2013: Korea Rural Economic Institute
August 1998 – February 2000: Korea Rural Economic Institute (dispatched to the Regulatory Reform Committee)
April 2006 – April 2012: Commissioner of the Ministry for Food, Agriculture, Forestry, and Fisheries Regulatory Audit Committee
June 2008 – December 2009: Subcommittee member of the Special Commission on Agriculture, Fisheries, and Rural Policies
October 2008 – July 2011: Member of the Presidential Committee on Regional Development, Regional Development Expert Committee
October 2011 – January 2013: Member of the Commission on Regional Development of Rural Areas and Life Quality Enhancement for Farmers and Fishermen
November 2011 – January 2013: Member of the Central Agricultural, Fisheries, Rural and Food Industries Policy Council

Awards 
April 1999: Civil Merit Medal
July 2011: Order of Civil Merit, Camellia Medal

References 

Living people
Ministers of Agriculture of South Korea
1955 births
People from North Gyeongsang Province
Seoul National University alumni
University of Missouri alumni